Enfield South Platform is a former railway station on the Flemington-Campsie Goods Line in Sydney, New South Wales, Australia. It was used by workers at the nearby Enfield Tarpaulin Factory and also signallers at the nearby Enfield South signal box. The factory was used by the railway to make tarpaulins for covering open wagons. It was decommissioned in 1996.

A 2009 report to NSW Ports determined the site of the station contains several artefacts constituting "state significance". The Enfield Intermodal Logistics Centre now exists on the site of Enfield South. Only remnants of the station remain.

Neighbouring stations 
Campsie station on the Bankstown railway line is located up whereas the former Enfield Loco Platform is located down from Enfield South.

References

Disused railway stations in Sydney
Railway stations in Australia opened in 1957